Nogyang Station is a station on the Gyeongwon Line in South Korea.  It is served by Seoul Subway Line 1.  The station lies in the far northern end of Uijeongbu in Gyeonggi-do.

Platforms
 Platform 1: to Ganeung / Seoul Station / Kwangwoon University / Incheon
 Platform 2: to Yangju / Dongducheon / Soyosan

Exits
 Exit 1: Nogyang-dong Community Center, Uijeongbu District Court, Uijeongbu District Public Prosecutor's Office, Uijeongbu Kwangdong High School
 Exit 2: Nogyang Park, Hadonggyo, Nogyangsageori, Pyeonghwa-ro

The vicinity of the station 

 Uijeongbu District Prosecutors' Office
 Uijeongbu Indoor Ice Rink
 Uijeongbu Gymnasium (Professional Volleyball V-League Men's Uijeongbu KB Insurance Stars Home Stadium)
 Uijeongbu Sports Complex
 Nokyang Elementary School

References

Seoul Metropolitan Subway stations
Metro stations in Uijeongbu
Railway stations opened in 2006